Lyndon Johnston (born December 4, 1961) is a Canadian former pair skater. With Cindy Landry, he is the 1989 World silver medallist and 1990 Canadian national champion.

Personal life 
Johnston was born on December 4, 1961, in Hamiota, Manitoba.

Career 
Johnston represented Hamiota Figure Skating Club.

Partnership with Kunhegyi 
In 1981, Johnston and his partner, Melinda Kunhegyi, won three international medals – silver at the Nebelhorn Trophy, gold at the Prague Skate, and gold at the Grand Prix International St. Gervais. In 1982, they took silver at the St. Ivel International.

During the 1983–1984 season, the pair won bronze at the 1983 Skate America and then silver at the 1984 Canadian Championships. They placed 12th at the 1984 Winter Olympics in Sarajevo, Yugoslavia.

In their final season together, Kunhegyi/Johnston won silver at the Ennia Challenge Cup and Canadian Championships. They placed fifth at the 1985 World Championships in Tokyo, Japan.

Kunhegyi/Johnston won three national titles in four skating, taking gold in 1982, 1984, and 1985.

Partnership with Benning 
In the 1985–1986 season, Johnston began competing with Denise Benning. The pair won several international medals, including bronze at the 1985 NHK Trophy, bronze at the 1985 Skate Canada International, silver at the 1986 Skate America, and gold at the 1987 St. Ivel International. At the Canadian Championships, they became three-time pair skating medallists (silver in 1986 and 1987, bronze in 1988) and three-time four skating champions (1986–1988).

Benning/Johnston finished fifth at three consecutive World Championships and sixth at the 1988 Winter Olympics in Calgary, Alberta, Canada.

Partnership with Landry 
Later in 1988, Johnston teamed up with Cindy Landry from Quebec. The pair won silver at the 1989 World Championships and gold at the 1990 Canadian Championships. After placing 9th at the 1990 World Championships, they both turned professional.

Johnston was inducted into the Manitoba Sports Hall of Fame and Museum in 1993.

Results

Pairs with Kunhegyi

Pairs with Benning

Pairs with Landry

References 

1961 births
Living people
Canadian male pair skaters
Figure skaters at the 1984 Winter Olympics
Figure skaters at the 1988 Winter Olympics
Olympic figure skaters of Canada
World Figure Skating Championships medalists
Canadian LGBT sportspeople
Gay sportsmen
20th-century Canadian people
21st-century Canadian people
21st-century Canadian LGBT people
20th-century Canadian LGBT people
Canadian gay men